Rolando García Guerreño (born 10 February 1990 in Asunción, Paraguay) is a Paraguayan footballer currently playing for Club Nacional.

Career

Club
Rolando García started his career in 2009 with Paraguayan club 2 de Mayo, his stay with the club was short as he left a year later to join Primera B Nacional team Defensa y Justicia; his debut for Defensa y Justicia came on 6 February 2010 against San Martín de Tucumán. It wasn't until the 2011–12 season that García scored his first goal for the club, in a 3–0 home win over Chacarita Juniors in August 2011. In his following and final season with the club, 2012–13, he scored 4 goals in 32 appearances as they finished sixth. He departed Defensa y Justicia in 2013 and subsequently joined Ascenso MX club Lobos BUAP. He remained with the Mexicans for one season before leaving as he made 21 league appearances and scored two goals.

Godoy Cruz became his fourth club in 2014 but, after four months and 15 games/1 goal, García left to join another Argentine team, Unión Santa Fe. His first match for his latest team came on 15 February 2015 against Huracán.

International
García has represented Paraguay once at international level, with his only cap so far coming with the Paraguay U20s when he was called up for the 2009 FIFA U-20 World Cup and played once; versus South Korea U20s.

Career statistics

References

External links
 Profile at BDFA 
 

1990 births
Living people
Paraguayan footballers
Paraguay under-20 international footballers
Paraguayan expatriate footballers
Argentine Primera División players
Primera Nacional players
Ascenso MX players
Paraguayan Primera División players
2 de Mayo footballers
Defensa y Justicia footballers
Lobos BUAP footballers
Godoy Cruz Antonio Tomba footballers
Unión de Santa Fe footballers
Club Atlético Lanús footballers
Club Guaraní players
Club Atlético Patronato footballers
Club Nacional footballers
Association football defenders
Paraguayan expatriate sportspeople in Argentina
Paraguayan expatriate sportspeople in Mexico
Expatriate footballers in Argentina
Expatriate footballers in Mexico